Ban Rai is a district (amphoe) in Uthai Thani province in western Thailand.

Geography
The district covers more than half of the province of Uthai Thani and is also the third-largest district in Thailand. A large part of the district is part of the Huai Kha Khaeng Wildlife Sanctuary.

Neighboring districts are (from the north clockwise) Mae Poen of Nakhon Sawan province; Lan Sak, Huai Khot, and Nong Chang of Uthai Thani Province; Nong Mamong, Hankha, and Noen Kham of Chai Nat province; Dan Chang of Suphan Buri province; Si Sawat and Thong Pha Phum of Kanchanaburi province; and Umphang of Tak province.

Administration
The district is divided into 13 sub-districts (tambons), which are further subdivided into 134 villages (mubans). There are two townships (thesaban tambon). Ban Rai covers parts of tambons Ban Rai and Ban Bueng, and Mueang Ka Rung
covers parts of the same-named tambon. There are a further 12 tambon administrative organizations (TAO).

Economy
The village of Baan Tab Klai is known for its cultivation of eri silkworms to produce eri silk. Silkworm farmers have created a collective to produce the fibre using clean technologies such as all-natural dyes. The moths that produce the cocoons are not harmed in the process, leading some to call it "peace silk".

References

Ban Rai